Aziza Amir (17 December 1901 – 28 February 1952) was an Egyptian actress, producer, and screenwriter. She has legendary status in Egyptian film. She was the first wife of Mahmoud Zulfikar.

Early life and career
Aziza Amir was born Mofida Mohamed Ghoneim in Damiettia, Egypt on 17 December 1901. Amir went to school at Hosn El Massarat on Mohamed Ali Street. Her dad worked at sea to provide for her family. Amir changed her name due to the general outlook of Egyptian society on theatre women and how it would’ve negatively affected her family's reputation. After the revolution of 1919 women's levels of energy rose and they wanted to make a difference. Amir got her acting start in the theater. Aziza then took the stage and started working as a theatre actress. She played the part of Napoleon's Daughter on stage, and that is how she met her first husband Ahmed El Sheirei, who was the mayor of Samalout.

She joined the "Ramsis" acting troupe in 1925. She acted in the theater until 1935, when she decided to focus her attention on films. After years in the theatre business she decided to get into the cinema business, She starred in what scholars arguably call the first Egyptian film ever made Laila (1927) was released on 16 November 1927. The release of Laila (1927) came after various problems with its Turkish Director Wadad Orfi and German producers. There were disputes while the film was being made and, as a result, Orfi was replaced by Stephane Rosti. Both the media and Amir husband's family at the time of Laila'''s release opposed her participation in the film; Laila went on to be a success.

In 1933, she wrote, directed, and starred in Pay for your Sins (1933).

Egypt's film industry began to thrive in the 1940s; Amir began to write more screenplays as a result. She would eventually have seventeen writing credits to her name.

Amir had an adopted daughter Amira who acted alongside her in the film My Daughter (1944).

Amir would star and produce a total of twenty five films in her lifetime.

Amir also starred in the silent film Fattah min Istanbul (1928) and played the role of Brezka in the film Ahl El Kahf.Amir got into the film industry and stayed and worked in different factions of film production, be it producer, actress or director. She produced the movie A Girl from Palestine (1948) about the Palestinian struggle with her husband Mahmoud Zulfikar and Soad Mohamed in the lead. Talaat Harb was cited saying "she achieved what men had not been able to achieve." Taha Hussein said "she possesses the golden voice."

Amir introduced a dance by the famous dancer Bamba Kashar in Laila (1927)  Dance was also included in hundreds of Egyptian musical melodramas which followed this film. Amir went on to star in almost two dozen films, many of them directed by her husband, the actor-director Mahmoud Zulfikar. There are some arguments as to whether Amir directed the two films for which she is sometimes given the director's credit, Bint al-Nıˆl /The Girl from the Nile (1929) and Kaffirıˆ ‘an khati’atik /Atone for your Sins (1933), but what is certain is that she produced most of the films in which she starred through her own production company, Isis Films. She remained active as a leading actress and producer up to her death at the age of fifty-one, when she passed from an un-described terminal illness.

Politics and the film industry
With the release of Laila, during the 1920s while Egypt was just setting its feet and being built up as a nation of its own, separate from its British colonists, sense of nationalism and belonging was sky rocketing and society hoped to see an Egyptian film.  However, this was not the reason that Amir replaced Turkish director Wadad Orfi with Stephane Rosti, rather his efforts on another film project were disastrous.   The movie Laila (1927) was screened in the royal palace to King Fuuad, the film's "'Egyptianness' suitably timely and galvanizing to appeal across the board." As Saad Zaghloul became prime minister and the new constitution issued that all men and women are equal in the way they serve their country, this added to the overall sense of belonging and national pride to many women. Amir's role in the movie Laila was more than just a silent role but attempted to mend the old culture with the more contemporary one, showing the character in more rural areas while also connecting the character to more pharaonic roots by showing her in the deserts of Saqarra. As the country struggled with its own identity and westernization and discourses of conservatism juxtaposed against liberalism, Aziza Amir's performance in her film Laila is still of note and mentioned as the first Egyptian movie ever made.

Feminism
As Egypt struggled to build its own identity, people did not know whether to hold on to their old traditions or the new. Movements like Feminism appeared in Egypt but in its own variant. Egyptians chose to concentrate on women's power and status within the home and on breeding nationalist potency largely within the domestic sphere. In appealing to the more family-centered traditions of Arab kinship structures, Egyptian feminism marked itself out as separate and not imported from other foreign women’s liberation movements. Amir's identity that was strikingly outside the classic feminine image nationalists were attempting to build is however was underplayed by her rhetoric that focused on maternity and the idea of looking at "Egypt as a family." On the other hand, Amir's smart and well spoken dialogue about her position as a woman and filmmaker by smartly using the previously stated rhetoric to empower her own independence by stating "I have one daughter and that is Egyptian Cinema". She flipped the national dialogue and themes of maternity upside down, strengthening her position as a working woman in the film industry. Amir is often affectionately referred to as the "godmother of Egyptian cinema."

Selected filmography
As actress
 Laila (1927) 
 Daughter of the Nile (1929) Istanbul sokaklarinda (1931)Pay for Your Sins (1933)His Highness Wishes to Marry (1936)The Apple Seller (1940)
 El warsha (1941) Wedding Night (1942)
 Ibn El-balad (1942)Valley of Stars (1943)
 The Magic Hat (1944)My Daughter (1945)Money (1945)The Return of the Magic Hat (1946)
 The Unknown Singer (1946) All is Well with the World (1946)A Candle Is Burning (1946)
 Hadaya (1947)
 Above the Clouds (1948) 
 Everyone is Singing (1948)
 Nadia (1949)
 Fate and Fortune (1951)

As writerPay for Your Sins (1933)The Workshop (1940)El warsha (1941)
 Ibn El-Balad (1942)
 The Magic Hat (1944) 
 My Daughter (1944)
 Hadaya (1947)
 Above the Clouds (1948) 
 A Girl from Palestine (1948)
 My Father Deceived Me (1951)

As producer
 Laila (1927) 
 Pay for your Sins (1933)My Daughter (1945)
 Hadaya (1947)
 Everyone Is Singing (1948)
 The Night is Ours (1949)
 Above the Clouds (1948)Virtue for Sale (1950)
 My Father Deceived Me (1951)

 As director 
 Daughter of the Nile (1927)
 Pay for Your Sins'' (1933)

Notes

References

External links

20th-century Egyptian actresses
1901 births
1952 deaths
People from Damietta
Egyptian film actresses
Egyptian stage actresses
Egyptian screenwriters
20th-century screenwriters